The following is a list of Michigan State Historic Sites in Wayne County, Michigan. Sites marked with a dagger (†) are also listed on the National Register of Historic Places in Wayne County, Michigan. Those with a double dagger (‡) are also designated National Historic Landmarks.


Current listings

See also
 National Register of Historic Places listings in Wayne County, Michigan

Sources
 Historic Sites Online – Wayne County. Michigan State Housing Developmental Authority. Accessed January 4, 2011.

References

 01
 01
Wayne County
Tourist attractions in Wayne County, Michigan